Since acceding to the throne of Spain in 2014, King Felipe VI has received a number of state and official visits. He usually hosts one or two visiting heads of state each year.

List of visits

Countries who have made state visits

See also

Sources 

Felipe VI, state visits received
Felipe VI
Foreign relations of Spain